Metopograpsus messor is a species of grapsid crab that lives in mangroves from East Africa to Fiji.

Description

The carapace and legs are mottled brownish green, while the claws are brownish red.

Distribution
The distribution of M. messor extends from East Africa, along the coast of the Indian Ocean, including the Red Sea and the Persian Gulf, and at least as far east as Fiji. Knowledge of its distribution has been clouded by confusion between M. messor and M. thukuhar, which can only be told apart by detailed examination, but there are reports of M. messor as far east as the Hawaiian Islands.

Ecology
M. messor lives in mangroves (including Avicennia marina and Sonneratia alba), as well as on rocky shores. It lives under rotting wood, and is capable of climbing trees.

Taxonomic history
Metopograpsus messor was first described under the name Cancer messor by Peter Forsskål in 1775, in his , based on material he collected at Suez.

References

Grapsidae
Crustaceans described in 1775
Taxa named by Peter Forsskål